Demanufacture is the second studio album by American heavy metal band Fear Factory, released on June 13, 1995 by Roadrunner Records. This is the band's first album with their classic line-up, adding new bassist Christian Olde Wolbers. Although credited, his actual input is disputed between current and former band members. Many regard it as the band's best album and a heavy metal classic. The album was certified Gold in Australia by ARIA and Silver in the UK by the BPI.

Album information 
Demanufacture is a concept album about a man's struggles against a machine-controlled government, with each song a chapter in his life. The band stated the album took its inspiration from the movie The Terminator.

This album was originally mixed by its producer Colin Richardson, who had performed both duties on the band's debut album. However, differences between the band and producer emerged over the mix, with Richardson wishing not to stray too far from Soul of a New Machine. In the 2005 re-release liner notes, Monte Conner notes Richardson's focus on the guitars at the expense of the electronics, and suggests that this is the reason for the rejection of Richardson's mix. The final mix for the album was subsequently performed by Greg Reely, Rhys Fulber and the band. The Richardson mixes of "Zero Signal" and "Body Hammer" were later released on the Hatefiles compilation.

The album was recorded at Bearsville Studios in rural New York. Also in residence at the studio was Bon Jovi, recording their album These Days. Fear Factory were in the studio next door and one of Bon Jovi's engineers asked them to turn the sound down, as it was bleeding into Bon Jovi's drum mics, during Bon Jovi's recording sessions.

After the release of the album, some critics and observers suggested that drummer Raymond Herrera had in fact used a drum machine, due to the often blistering speed and machine-like precision of the drumming, most notably on the bass drums. He records, however, with a click track to keep time. He is also known to use triggers on his drum sets for the purpose of keeping the sound of his drums consistent, particularly bass drums, regardless of how hard they are struck. This is a common strategy used by metal drummers when playing at such speeds, as relatively few drummers are able to achieve such rapid and consistent notes without the use of triggers.

Samples, loops, and electronic textures were handled by Rhys Fulber throughout the album, with Reynor Diego contributing additional samples and keyboard parts. The music for "A Therapy for Pain" was originally written as the opening for "Echoes of Innocence" from the then-unreleased Concrete album. The outro passage was inspired by John Carpenter, Hijokaidan, and Aphex Twin. The use of organ in "Dog Day Sunrise" was inspired from a in-joke between Diego and Bell about The Doors. During post-production work with Richardson, Bell performed and added the organ parts to the track.

The opening riff of the title track was voted 19th in Total Guitars list of "The Heaviest Riffs of all Time". The opening sample for "Pisschrist" and "Zero Signal" are both taken from Terminator 2: Judgment Day. Concrete also had a track named "Piss Christ", but the two bear no similarities other than the title.

The original digipaks had slightly different artwork, most noticeably a different barcode on the front cover, and different colouring within the words "Fear Factory". The digipak was re-released in 2003 with all bonus tracks mentioned above, but with the new Roadrunner Records logo on the front and back and different lettering on the spine. This version is not limited, but has since been replaced by the remastered edition detailed below. In all, four different digipak versions of the album are available.

Tracks 1 to 4 were featured on 2006's The Best of Fear Factory.

In July 2013, the band toured Australia performing Demanufacture in its entirety.

In celebration of the 20 year anniversary of Demanufacture in 2015, Fear Factory embarked on a tour across Europe and North America playing the album.

"Your Mistake" is from the album Victim in Pain.

Involvement of Christian Olde Wolbers
Although Christian Olde Wolbers is credited as the bassist for the album and appears in the band photo, Dino Cazares has repeatedly claimed to have played bass himself on all tracks; because Olde Wolbers was not in the band during recording but joined before the album's release and promotional tour. However, his claims are partially contradicted by former drummer Raymond Hererra who has said that Olde Wolbers was a full member during production but did not perform on all tracks, due to Cazares re-arranging many riffs during tracking of his guitars. The band were behind schedule with recording and Olde Wolbers did not have time to learn the new arrangements so Cazares recorded bass on these tracks. Olde Wolbers later mentioned in an interview in 2004 that he made a small contribution to the writing of the title track and "Pisschrist".

In popular culture 
The music video for the song "Replica" is unlockable in the video game Test Drive 5. Several songs from this album were used without lyrics for the game Carmageddon. These were "Demanufacture", "Zero Signal" (which had the piano ending omitted) and "Body Hammer". 

"Zero Signal" was also featured on the soundtrack to the movie Mortal Kombat and can be heard in part during the fight scene between Scorpion and Johnny Cage, although the song was an Instrumental. In reference to this, the band regularly featured a vocal sample of Cary-Hiroyuki Tagawa's character of Shang Tsung in the movie saying "Fatality" during live performances of the song thereafter. 

"Demanufacture" was also used in the opening video of GameShark 2 released by Mad Catz in 2004, along with numerous other Fear Factory songs.

Reception 

Upon its release, Demanufacture proved to be extraordinarily successful and received universal acclaim from music critics. It is often called a landmark record in alternative metal and heavy metal in general, and is often regarded as the band's best album. Andrew Kapper of About.com named Demanufacture as the recommended album to listen to by the band, and stated in his review:

 Kerrang! (p. 61) - "[T]his is a landmark of '90s metal that defied categorisation and remains a touchstone of the genre."
 Kerrang! (p. 51) - "[With] sonorous, soaring vocal hooks. The melding of power and melody proved a statement of absolute power."
 Metal Hammer (p. 60) - "So far ahead of its time that bands are still failing to rip it off convincingly today, Fear Factory's ultra-precise extreme metal attack and pioneering harsh-to-clean vocal approach dragged metal into the future."

"Replica" was covered by Dutch symphonic metal band Epica in 2007 as part of a "deluxe re-release" of the album The Divine Conspiracy, and was performed live by them at the Whisky a Go Go in Hollywood, California, with Dino Cazares joining on stage in September 2007. "Flashpoint" was covered as a one-man effort by American metal artist Common Dead in 2012 as a standalone single. "Pisschrist" was covered by American heavy metal band Byzantine in 2016 as part of their re-release of their 2015 album To Release Is to Resolve for the European region.

Track listing 
All music by Dino Cazares and Raymond Herrera except where noted; All lyrics by Burton C. Bell except where noted

Remastered Special Edition (2005) 

On June 7, 2005, a newly remastered, "special edition" of Demanufacture was issued in an all-new, 2-Disc digipak. Demanufacture (Special Edition) was released as part of the Roadrunner Records 25th Anniversary Reissue Series.

Disc 1 included the remastered, Demanufacture album, along with bonus tracks, mostly from the Demanufacture sessions.

Disc 2 included the remastered, Remanufacture – Cloning Technology album, along with bonus tracks from the Remanufacture remix sessions.

Disc 1 Notes:

▪︎Remastered by Ted Jensen at Sterling Sound, NYC - March 2005

▪︎Bonus tracks 12-15 were recorded and mixed as part of the Demanufacture sessions

▪︎One other song from the Demanufacture sessions, "Replica (Electric Sheep Mix)", was not included due to space limitations, but it was previously available on the (US & Canadian) digipak version of Demanufacture

▪︎Bonus Track 17 is an out-take from the Remanufacture remix sessions

▪︎Bonus Track 16 is not an out-take - it was created independently of the Remanufacture album

Personnel

Fear Factory
Burton C. Bell (credited as "Dry Lung Vocal Martyr") – lead vocals, arrangements, add. keyboards, lyrics
Dino Cazares (credited as "Heavy Duty Scarifier") – guitars, bass
Raymond Herrera (credited as "Maximum Effective Pulse Generator") – drums
Christian Olde Wolbers (credited as "Total Harmonic Distortion") – bass guitar

Additional musicians
Reynor Diego – live keyboards, sampling, add. keyboards
Rhys Fulber – keyboards, synthesizers, sampling, effects, mixing
Freddy Cricien – guest vocals on "Your Mistake"

Additional personnel
 Colin Richardson – producer
 Dave McKean – cover artwork
 Greg Reely – mixing
 George Marino – mastering
 Ted Jensen – remastering (2005 Special Edition)

Charts

Release history

References 

1995 albums
Fear Factory albums
Roadrunner Records albums
Albums produced by Colin Richardson
Albums produced by Rhys Fulber
Albums with cover art by Dave McKean
Concept albums